BIOTECanada, or the Industrial Biotechnology Association of Canada, is a Canadian biotechnology industry association based in Ottawa, Ontario. It is an industry-funded membership organization composed of over 250 national and international pharmaceutical and gene therapy companies, medical device manufacturers, agricultural science businesses, law firms, academic institutions, research and development networks, advertising agencies, insurance companies and financial services firms. 

BIOTECanada and the University of Western Ontario jointly administer the Gold Leaf Awards, presented annually to individuals and organizations who are deemed to have made significant contributions to Canada's biotechnology sector.

History 
The organization was incorporated in 1987 as the Industrial Biotechnology Association of Canada.

Health Canada partnered with BIOTECanada in May 2012 to organize a summit on clinical and regulatory topics associated with biosimilars. The event was held in association with the International Alliance for Biological Standardization, and was observed by representatives from the Patented Medicine Prices Review Board and the Canadian Agency for Drugs and Technologies in Health. Panelists included representatives from academia, regulatory bodies and industry, such as UMass Memorial Health, Janssen Pharmaceuticals, the Robarts Research Institute, Alberta Blue Cross, Mount Sinai Hospital and Sunnybrook Health Sciences Centre.

In 2017, BIOTECanada published a report detailing proposed initiatives to use biotechnology to address issues including population growth, climate change, food security, health, and economic instability. President and CEO Andrew Casey sent a letter in July 2017 to Innovation, Science and Economic Development Canada proposing measures to offset costs of patent filings, and to reduce taxation on intellectual property revenues.

In June 2022, BIOTECanada hosted the Canada Pavilion at the BIO International Convention, an annual biotechnology conference led by the  Biotechnology Innovation Organization (BIO).

Organization

Partners 
BIOTECanada is partnered with Avantor, Borden Ladner Gervais, Silicon Valley Bank, and Wilson Sonsini Goodrich & Rosati. The organization is also a supporting member of BioTalent Canada, a professional network for the biotechnology community. It is also a member of the Biotechnology Innovation Organization (BIO), and a founding institution of Clinical Trials Ontario. It is a participating organization of the Virtual Biosecurity Center, an initiative of the Federation of American Scientists.

Members 
BIOTECanada's current membership includes:

Former members include the Agricultural Institute of Canada, BioAlberta, Centre for the Commercialization of Antibodies and Biologics, Ernst & Young, Genzyme, Innovation PEI, International Centre for Infectious Disease, Johnson & Johnson, KPMG, Life Sciences Association of Manitoba, McKesson Corporation, National Research Council Canada, Pan-Provincial Vaccine Enterprise, PricewaterhouseCoopers, Sanofi Pasteur, Shoppers Drug Mart Specialty Health Network, University of Guelph, University of Manitoba and University of Waterloo.

References 

Biotechnology organizations
Scientific organizations based in Canada
Lobbying organizations in Canada